David Beach may refer to:

 David Beach (historian) (1943–1999), Zimbabwean historian
 David Nelson Beach (1848–1926), American theologian
 David Beach (judge), of Supreme Court of Victoria

See also
 David Beech (born 1954), curator of the British Library Philatelic Collections